Nassenfels is a municipality in the district of Eichstätt in Bavaria in Germany.

Mayors
since 2014: Thomas Hollinger
 1996-2014: Andreas Husterer 
? Peter Hecker

References

Eichstätt (district)